Clover (1970) is the first album by Clover.

Track listing
"Shotgun" (Junior Walker) - 2:10
"Southbound Train" (Alex Call, John McFee) - 3:38
"Going to the Country" (Johnny Ciambotti) - 2:29
"Monopoly" (Ciambotti) - 2:00
"Stealin'" (Call, Ed Bogas) - 4:33
"Wade in the Water" (Traditional; arranged by Clover) - 4:31
"No Vacancy" (Ciambotti) - 3:09
"Lizard Rock N' Roll Band" (Call, Bogas) - 2:57
"Come" (Call) - 3:45
"Could You Call It Love" (Call, McFee) - 2:39

Personnel

Clover
 Alex Call – lead vocals, rhythm guitar
 John McFee – lead and steel guitar, vocals
 John Ciambotti – bass, backing vocals
 Mitch Howie – drums

Additional Personnel
 Ed Bogas – fiddle

References

1970 debut albums
Clover (band) albums
albums produced by Ed Bogas
Fantasy Records albums